Young and Wild may refer to:

 Young and Wild (1958 film), a 1958 American crime film
 Young and Wild (album), a 1998 album by Cherie & Marie Currie
 "Young and Wild" (song), a 2015 song by the Zac Brown Band
 Young & Wild (2012 film), a 2012 Chilean comedy-drama film